China–Denmark relations are foreign relations between China and Denmark. Denmark recognized the People's Republic of China on January 9, 1950, and the two countries established diplomatic relations on May 11, 1950. On February 15, 1956, the two countries upgraded diplomatic relations from ministerial to ambassadorial level and exchanged ambassadors. China has an embassy in Copenhagen.  Denmark has an embassy in Beijing and 4 general consulates in Chongqing, Guangzhou, Hong Kong and Shanghai.

History
In 1870 the Danish ironclad Tordenskjold visited China. In 1899 and 1900, the Danish cruiser Valkyrien visited China with Prince Valdemar of Denmark aboard.

Dalai Lama

China suspended ties with Denmark after its Prime Minister met the Dalai Lama and resumed them only after the Danish government issued a statement in December 2009 saying it would oppose Tibetan independence and consider Beijing's reaction before inviting him again.

Greenland
China has invested in several projects in Greenland, including in mines for rare-earth elements. iron, and uranium.

In 2018, the China Communications Construction responded to a request for proposals from the Government of Greenland for the construction and operation of three airports in Nuuk, Ilulissat and Qaqortoq. The government of Denmark has objected to the bid, citing security objections.

Hong Kong
In June 2020, Denmark openly opposed the Hong Kong national security law.

See also
Foreign relations of China
Foreign relations of Denmark
Tibet flag case

References

External links
  Ministry Foreign Affairs of the People's Republic of China about relations with Denmark
  Danish embassy in Beijing

 
Denmark
Bilateral relations of Denmark